Aurélie Neyret (born May 24, 1983) is a French illustrator and cartoonist of bande dessinée.

Biography
Neyret took courses at the  before training as an autodidact. She collaborated with the press, especially youth publications. She participated in collective albums before publishing her first book, Les Carnets de Cerise (2012) with Joris Chamblain. The series met with great critical success and notably won the Angoulême International Comics Festival Prix Jeunesse 9–12 ans in 2014. In February 2016, Neyret refused her appointment to the Ordre des Arts et des Lettres, like three other female comic strip writers.

Bande dessinée

Holdings
 Contes et légendes des pays celtes en bande dessinées, Petit à petit, 2009.
 Michael Jackson en bandes dessinées, Petit à petit, 2009.
 Les Contes en bandes dessinées, Petit à petit, 2010.
 The Rolling Stones en bandes dessinées, Petit à petit, 2010.

Albums
 Les Filles de Soleil, Soleil: vol.19 (2014), vol.20 (2015), vol.21 (2016), vol.22 (2017), vol.23 (2018), vol.24 (2019).
 Les Carnets de Cerise, scripted by Joris Chamblain, collection Métamorphose, Soleil:
 Le Zoo pétrifié, 2012 
 Le Livre d'Hector, 2013 
 Le Dernier des cinq trésors, 2014 
 La Déesse sans visage, 2016
 Des premières neiges aux perséides, 2017
 Special edition: Les Carnets de Cerise et Valentin , 2018
 Lulu et Nelson, written by Charlotte Girard and Jean-Marie Omont, Soleil:
 Cap sur l'Afrique, 2019
 Le royaume des lions, 2020
 La lionne blanche, 2022

Selected awards and distinctions
Youth selection, Festival d'Angoulême 2013 for Les carnets de Cerise, volume 1: Le Zoo pétrifié, scripted by Joris Chamblain
Youth Prize, Angoulême Festival 2014 for Les Carnets de Cerise, volume 2: Le Livre d'Hector, scripted by Joris Chamblain
Prix Livrentête 2014, Junior Comics Category, for Les carnets de Cerise, volume 1: Le Zoo pétrifié, scripted by Joris Chamblain
 Prize for Education 41 for Young Audiences, for Les Carnets de Cerise, volume 2: Le Livre d'Hector
Saint-Michel Prize, Humor-Youth Category 2015, for Les Carnets de Cerise, volume 3: Le Dernier des cinq trésors, scripted by Joris Chamblain
Prix du Paille-en-queue 2016 at the "Salon du Livre jeunesse de l'océan Indien", Category 5th-4th for Les Carnets de Cerise, volume 4: La Déesse sans visage,, scripted by Joris Chamblain.
Guest of honor, Festival international de la bande dessinée de Chambéry.
2020: bd BOUM (Ligue de l'enseignement 41 prize for young audiences), with Charlotte Girard and Jean-Marie Omont for Lulu et Nelson t. 1 Cap sur l'Afrique, Soleil.

References

1983 births
Living people
French illustrators
French cartoonists
French comics writers
French comics artists